Collagen alpha-1(XII) chain is a protein that in humans is encoded by the COL12A1 gene.

This gene encodes the alpha chain of type XII collagen, a member of the FACIT (fibril-associated collagens with interrupted triple helices) collagen family. Type XII collagen is a homotrimer found in association with type I collagen, an association that is thought to modify the interactions between collagen I fibrils and the surrounding matrix. 

Alternatively spliced transcript variants encoding different isoforms have been identified.

Clinical significance
 Ehlers-Danlos syndrome Myopathic type is associated with mutations in the COL12A1 gene

References

Further reading

Collagens